Vladimír Ptáček (7 November 1954 – 13 August 2019) was a Czech basketball player. He competed in the men's tournament at the 1976 Summer Olympics.

References

External links
 

1954 births
2019 deaths
Czechoslovak men's basketball players
Olympic basketball players of Czechoslovakia
Basketball players at the 1976 Summer Olympics
Sportspeople from Prague
1978 FIBA World Championship players
1982 FIBA World Championship players
Czech men's basketball players